The Kortrijk Formation (abbreviation: Ko; named after the West Flemish city of Kortrijk) is a geologic formation in the Belgian subsurface. This formation crops out in northern Hainaut, southern West and East Flanders and in Walloon Brabant. The formation consists of marine clay from the Ypresian age (early Eocene, about 54 million years old).

Description 
The Kortrijk Formation consists predominantly of clay, sometimes sandy or silty. The formation generally becomes sandier to the east, in Brabant and the Campine area. In some places fossils or bioturbation occur.

Subdivision 
The Kortrijk Formation is subdivided into at least four members: the Mont Héribou, Orchies or Saint-Maur, Moen or Roubaix and the Aalbeke Member. The Kortrijk Formation forms the lowest part of the Ieper Group and is stratigraphically overlain by the younger Tielt Formation (late Ypresian marine sand), part of the same group. The Kortrijk Formation lies on top of late Paleocene formations like the Tienen Formation or Hannut Formation, both part of the Landen Group.

See also 
 List of fossiliferous stratigraphic units in Belgium
 Ypresian formations
 Fur Formation of Denmark
 London Clay Formation of England
 Silveirinha Formation of Portugal
 Wasatchian formations
 Nanjemoy Formation of the eastern United States
 Wasatch Formation of the western United States
 Itaboraian formations
 Itaboraí Formation of Brazil
 Laguna del Hunco Formation of Argentina

References

Bibliography 

 
 
 

Geologic formations of Belgium
Eocene Series of Europe
Paleogene Belgium
Ypresian Stage
Shale formations
Shallow marine deposits
Formations
Formations
Formations
Formations